Anina Pinter is a Los Angeles-based costume designer known for her work in films such as The Field Guide To Evil, Divergent and the National Geographic television series Year Million. She was born in Hungary, later training in Rome for 10 years with Italian costume designers Carlo Poggioli, Gabriella Pescucci and Milena Canonero, studying costume design in Rome with Piero Tosi at Centro Sperimentale di Cinematografia.

Career
After the years of training in Rome, Anina began to work internationally on feature films as a costume designer, beginning with Perlasca – Un eroe Italiano.
She worked as a costume illustrator on Peter Strickland's 2014 film The Duke of Burgundy. In 2016, Pinter worked with Italian Director Ivan Silvestrini on a Sky Italia feature film production, Monolith which was nominated for a David di Donatello Award. In 2017, Pinter was the costume designer for the National Geographic sci-fi docudrama TV series Year Million.

In 2018, she worked with British director Peter Strickland as costume designer for his segment of Legion M's The Field Guide To Evil, a horror anthology that screened at SXSW as well as film festivals around the world.

Pinter was announced as one of the international judges for the Not Film Fest in Santarcangelo di Romagna, Italy, held in 2018.

Filmography

Film

Television

References

External links

Centro Sperimentale di Cinematografia alumni
Hungarian costume designers
Women costume designers
Living people
People from Nyíregyháza
Year of birth missing (living people)